John Greig (August 6, 1779 – April 9, 1858) was an American lawyer and politician who served briefly as a United States representative from New York in 1841.

Biography
Greig was born in Moffat, Dumfriesshire, Scotland in the Kingdom of Great Britain on August 6, 1779 and attended the Edinburgh High School.

He immigrated to the United States in 1797, studied law; was admitted to the bar and commenced practice in Canandaigua, New York. He served as president of the Ontario Bank, was president of the Ontario Agricultural Society, and was a member and vice chancellor of the Board of Regents for the University of the State of New York.  He was also one of the founders of the Ontario Female Seminary.

Congress 
Greig was elected as a Whig to the Twenty-seventh Congress, filling the vacancy caused by the resignation of Francis Granger; he served from May 21, 1841 until his resignation on September 25, 1841.

Death and legacy 
He died in Canandaigua on April 9, 1858 with interment in West Avenue Cemetery.

The town of Greig in Lewis County was named for him.

References

1779 births
1858 deaths
Politicians from Canandaigua, New York
Scottish emigrants to the United States
People from Moffat
Whig Party members of the United States House of Representatives from New York (state)
19th-century American politicians